Dagur  is an Icelandic male given name.

People 

People with the name include:

 Dagur Arngrímsson (born 1987), Icelandic chess International Master
 Dagur Bergþóruson Eggertsson (born 1972), Icelandic politician
 Dagur Kár Jónsson (born 1995), Icelandic basketball player
 Dagur Kári (born 1973), Icelandic film director
Dagur Sigurðarson (1937–1994), Icelandic poet
 Dagur Sigurðsson (born 1973), retired Icelandic handball player
 Steinar Dagur Adolfsson (born 1970), retired Icelandic football defender

Fictional characters 
 Dagur the Deranged, an antagonist in the American animated television series DreamWorks Dragons

See also 
 Dagur (disambiguation)
 Dagger (disambiguation)
 Dagr, the personified day in Norse mythology

Icelandic masculine given names